Marshall William Darling (January 31, 1919 – October 27, 2009) was a Canadian ice hockey player with the Edmonton Mercurys. He won a gold medal at the 1950 World Ice Hockey Championships in London, England. The 1950 Edmonton Mercurys team was inducted to the Alberta Sports Hall of Fame in 2011. He previously played with the Lethbridge Maple Leafs and Edmonton athletic Club.

References

1919 births
2009 deaths
Canadian ice hockey right wingers